Community respiration (CR) refers to the total amount of carbon-dioxide that is produced by individuals organisms in a given
community, originating from the cellular respiration of organic material. CR is an important ecological index as it dictates the amount
of production for the higher trophic levels and influence biogeochemical cycles.
CR is often used as a proxy for the biological activity of the microbial community.

See also
 Microbial ecology

References

Ecology